Kaunas State Philharmonic is located in the former Palace of Justice and the Parliament. The building was designed by the engineer and architect Edmund Fryk.

History
The construction of the Palace of Justice and the Parliament began in 1925, in the former temporary capital, in the junction of L. Sapiegos and E. Ožeškienės streets. The construction was completed in 1928.

In 1961, the part of the building and the Great Hall was conveyed to the Department of Kaunas, of LSSR National Philharmonic Society. From 1944 to 1961, the Department of Kaunas did not have the constant hall, the concerts took place in the regions of the country, at various halls of the city, at Kaunas Sports Hall; the concerts in Kaunas were planned by the Lithuanian National Philharmonic Society. 

In 2006, under the decision of the Ministry of Culture of the Republic of Lithuania, the department of Lithuanian National Philharmonic Society has become the independent concert institution – Kaunas State Philharmonic Society. In the summer of 2005, the reconstruction began, and in 2008, on the 1st of October, the audience was invited to the renovated Kaunas State Philharmonic building.

References

Buildings and structures in Kaunas
Music venues in Lithuania
Palaces in Kaunas
Legislative buildings in Europe